The 2015–16 Welsh Premier League (known as the Dafabet Welsh Premier League for sponsorship reasons) was the 24th season of the Welsh Premier League, the highest football league within Wales since its establishment in 1992. The New Saints were the defending champions.

Teams played each other twice on a home and away basis, before the league was split into two groups at the end of January 2016 – the top six and the bottom six.

Teams

Cefn Druids and Prestatyn Town were relegated out of the Welsh Premier League the previous season, while Llandudno were promoted as winners of the Cymru Alliance and Haverfordwest County were promoted as winners of Welsh Football League Division One. It will be Llandudno's debut campaign in the league.

Stadia and locations

Personnel and kits

League table

Results
Teams played each other twice on a home and away basis, before the league split into two groups – the top six and the bottom six.

Matches 1–22

Matches 23–32

Top six

Bottom six

UEFA Europa League play-offs
Teams who finished in positions fourth to seventh at the end of the regular season participated in play-offs to determine the third participant for the 2016–17 UEFA Europa League, who will qualify for the first qualifying round.

Semi-finals

Final

References
The league's rules are contained as a section of the Handbook of the Football Association of Wales.

External links

Cymru Premier seasons
2015–16 in Welsh football
Wales